Vincas Svirskis (January 28, 1835 — March 7, 1916) was the most prominent Lithuanian folk sculptor and wood carver, known for his  works in Lithuanian cross crafting, god-carving and roofed pole carving.

References

1835 births
1916 deaths
Woodcarvers
Lithuanian sculptors
Lithuanian folk art